The KAIROS Prize has been awarded to European artists and scholars from the fields of visual and performing arts, music, architecture, design, film, photography, literature and journalism since 2007 by the Alfred Toepfer Foundation in Hamburg. It is endowed with a sum of 75,000 Euro.

Winners 
Source:

2007: Albrecht Dümling, German musicologist
2008: Tímea Junghaus, Hungarian art historian
2009: Sidi Larbi Cherkaoui, Belgian choreographer
2010: Andri Snær Magnason, Icelandic writer
2011: Şermin Langhoff, Turkish-German theatre director
2012: Katell Gélébart, French fashion designer
2013: Paweł Althamer, Polish sculptor and video artist
2014: Jasmila Žbanić, Bosnian film director
2015: Eike Roswag, German architect
2016: Teodor Currentzis, Greek-Russian conductor and musician
2017: Inci Bürhaniye and Selma Wels
2018: Jan Gerchow
2019: Nihad Kreševljaković, Bosnian historian and director
2020: Agnes Meyer-Brandis

See also

 List of European art awards

References

External links
  (Archive)

Awards established in 2007
European arts awards